The chestnut-capped babbler (Timalia pileata) is a passerine bird of the family Timaliidae. It is monotypic within the genus Timalia.

Distribution

This bird is native in Bangladesh, Cambodia, China, India, Indonesia, Laos, Myanmar, Nepal, Thailand, and Vietnam.

The Sukla Phanta Wildlife Reserve in Nepal represents the western limit of its distribution.

References

 Collar, N. J., Robson, C. (2007) Family Timaliidae (Babblers)  pp. 70 – 291 In: del Hoyo, J., Elliott, A., Christie, D.A. (eds.) Handbook of the Birds of the World, Vol. 12: Picathartes to Tits and Chickadees. Lynx Edicions, Barcelona.

External links
 BirdLife International: chestnut-capped babbler

chestnut-capped babbler
Birds of Southeast Asia
Birds of Bangladesh
Birds of Bhutan
Birds of South China
Birds of Nepal
Birds of India
chestnut-capped babbler
Taxonomy articles created by Polbot